The 1923–24 William & Mary Indians men's basketball team represented the College of William & Mary in intercollegiate basketball during the 1923–24 season. Under the first year of head coach J. Wilder Tasker (who concurrently served as the head football coach), the team finished the season with a 7–13 record. This was the 19th season of the collegiate basketball program at William & Mary, whose nickname is now the Tribe. The team played as an independent; William & Mary did not join the Southern Conference until 1936. Furthermore, this was William & Mary's first twenty-game season.

Schedule

|-
!colspan=9 style="background:#EE7600; color:#000000;"| Regular season

Source

References

William & Mary Tribe men's basketball seasons
William And Mary Indians
William and Mary Indians Men's Basketball Team
William and Mary Indians Men's Basketball Team